Liebbe, Nourse & Rasmussen was an architectural firm in the U.S. state of Iowa.  They designed Kromer Flats built in 1905. It designed courthouses, commercial buildings, and residences. Several are listed on the U.S. National Register of Historic Places.

The firm was established in 1899 as a partnership between Henry Frantz Liebbe (1851 -1927), Clinton C. Nourse, and Edward F. Rasmussen (1867 - 1930). Liebbe was born in Germany. He was in Des Moines by 1873. He married Medora Jones in 1879. He served as state architect from 1904 until his death.

Work
Wahkonsa Hotel (1910), 927 Central Ave., Fort Dodge, Iowa
College Corner Commercial Historic Business District, Euclid Ave., between Second and Third Aves. Des Moines, IA, NRHP-listed
Crawford House (1896), 2203 Grand Ave. Des Moines, IA, NRHP-listed
Des Moines City Hall (1910) was designed by four architectural firms: Liebbe, Nourse and Rasmussen, Hallett & Rawson, Wetherell & Gage, and Proudfoot & Bird
Ericson Public Library (1901), 702 Greene St. Boone, IA, NRHP-listed
First National Bank Building (1908), 629 Central Ave. Fort Dodge, IA, NRHP-listed
First National Bank of Mason City (1911), 5-7 N. Federal Ave. Mason City, IA, NRHP-listed
Hampton Public Library (1905), one of the Carnegie libraries of Iowa
Kromer Flats (1905), 1433—1439 6th Ave. Des Moines, IA, NRHP-listed
Municipal Building (1916), 420 Kellogg Ave. Ames, IA, NRHP-listed
The Oaklands Historic District, Oakland and Arlington Aves. between Franklin and College Aves. Des Moines, IA, NRHP-listed
Perry Carnegie Library Building (1904), 1123 Willis Ave. Perry, IA, NRHP-listed
Younker Brothers Department Store, 713 Walnut St. Des Moines, IA, NRHP-listed
One or more buildings in the Hampton Double Square Historic District, Downtown Hampton, Iowa, NRHP-listed
One or more buildings in the Iowa City Downtown Historic District, NRHP-listed
One or more buildings in the Washington and Elizabeth Miller Tract-Center-Soll Community Historic District, NRHP-listed

References

Architecture firms based in Iowa